Žiga Svete (born 13 April 1985, in Bled) is a Slovenian ice hockey defenceman. He is currently playing with HK Partizan of the Slohokej Liga.

Svete has played for the Slovenian junior national team in three IIHF World Junior Championships, and he played with the Slovenia men's national ice hockey team at the 2009 IIHF World Championship Division I.

References

External links

1985 births
HDD Olimpija Ljubljana players
HK Acroni Jesenice players
Slohokej Liga players
Slovenian ice hockey defencemen
Living people
People from Bled
HK Olimpija players
HK Partizan players
Dundee Stars players
Cardiff Devils players
HK Zemgale players
Geleen Smoke Eaters players
Étoile Noire de Strasbourg players
EC KAC players
HKMK Bled players
Slovenian expatriate sportspeople in Wales
Slovenian expatriate sportspeople in Scotland
Slovenian expatriate sportspeople in Italy
Slovenian expatriate sportspeople in Serbia
Slovenian expatriate sportspeople in the Netherlands
Slovenian expatriate sportspeople in France
Slovenian expatriate sportspeople in Germany
Slovenian expatriate sportspeople in Latvia
Slovenian expatriate sportspeople in Austria
Expatriate ice hockey players in Wales
Expatriate ice hockey players in Scotland
Expatriate ice hockey players in Italy
Expatriate ice hockey players in Serbia
Expatriate ice hockey players in the Netherlands
Expatriate ice hockey players in France
Expatriate ice hockey players in Germany
Expatriate ice hockey players in Latvia
Expatriate ice hockey players in Austria
Slovenian expatriate ice hockey people